Myra Alexandra Delgadillo Prado (born 9 December 1995) is an American-born Mexican footballer who plays as a forward for S.C. Braga and the Mexico women's national football team.

Early life
Delgadillo was born in Union City, California. She attended James Logan High School, captaining the varsity girls' soccer team for three years.

Club career

Fresno FC Ladies
In 2018, Delgadillo played for Fresno FC Ladies in the Women's Premier Soccer League.

Seattle Stars FC
In early 2019, Delgadillo played for the Seattle Stars FC in the Northwest Premier League.

ŽFK Spartak Subotica
In June 2019, Delgadillo joined Serbian Women's Super League side ŽFK Spartak Subotica.

S.C. Braga
In July 2020, Delgadillo signed with Campeonato Nacional Feminino side S.C. Braga.

International career
On 23 October 2021, Delgadillo made her debut for the Mexico national team in a 6–1 victory over Argentina at Estadio Gregorio "Tepa" Gómez.

References

External links

1995 births
Living people
Citizens of Mexico through descent
Mexican women's footballers
Women's association football forwards
ŽFK Spartak Subotica players
S.C. Braga (women's football) players
Campeonato Nacional de Futebol Feminino players
Mexico women's international footballers
Mexican expatriate women's footballers
Mexican expatriate sportspeople in Serbia
Expatriate women's footballers in Serbia
Mexican expatriate sportspeople in Portugal
Expatriate women's footballers in Portugal
People from Union City, California
Sportspeople from Alameda County, California
Soccer players from California
American women's soccer players
Fresno State Bulldogs women's soccer players
American expatriate women's soccer players
American expatriate sportspeople in Serbia
American expatriate sportspeople in Portugal
American sportspeople of Mexican descent